Jeffery Louis Martin is an American musician, singer and drummer who has sung for the bands Racer X, Bad Dog, Surgical Steel and St. Michael and played drums for the bands Badlands, the Michael Schenker Group, Blindside Blues Band, Red Sea, St. Michael and The Electric Fence, a side project with Paul Gilbert and Russ Parrish.  Jeff Martin played drums for Paul Gilbert, George Lynch, Dokken, and P.K. Mitchell.

Martin played drums in Surgical Steel before switching to lead vocals and was the drummer/lead vocalist for St. Michael, both Phoenix, AZ-based bands.

He released a lone solo album in 2006, The Fool, featuring the guitar talents of Paul Gilbert and Michael Schenker and has also sung backing vocals for Judas Priest and The Scream.

Martin appeared in the 1985 movie Thunder Alley, starring Leif Garrett, with his band Surgical Steel.

Discography

Solo
 The Fool (2006)

with Racer X
 Street Lethal (1986)
 Second Heat (1987)
 Extreme Volume Live (1988)
 Extreme Volume II Live (1992)
 Technical Difficulties (1999)
 Superheroes (2000)
 Live at the Whisky: Snowball of Doom (2001)
 Getting Heavier (2002)
 Official Bootleg: Snowball of Doom 2 (2002)

with Badlands
 Voodoo Highway (1991)
 Dusk (1998)

with Blindside Blues Band
 Blindside Blues Band (1993)
 Blindsided (1994)
 Messenger of the Blues (1995)

with Red Sea
 Blood (1994)

with Paul Gilbert
 King of Clubs (1998)
 Beehive Live (1999)
 Alligator Farm (2000)

with The Michael Schenker Group
 Be Aware of Scorpions (2001)
 Tales of Rock'N'Roll - Twenty-Five Years Celebration (2006)

Guest appearances
 Judas Priest - Turbo (1986)
 The Scream - Let It Scream (1991)
 Paul Gilbert & Jimi Kidd - Raw Blues Power (2002)
 Pete Way & Michael Schenker - The Plot (2003)
 George Lynch - Furious George (2004)
 Pat Travers - P.T. Power Trio 2 (2005)

Demos
 Surgical Steel - 3-song demo (1982)
 Surgical Steel - 6-song demo (1984)
 Bad Dog - demo (1990)
 Leatherwolf - 3-song demo (2004)

Compilations
 Metal Massacre II (1982) w/ Surgical Steel - "Rivet Head"
 U.S. Metal Vol. 4 (1984) w/ St. Michael - "The Beauty, The Power"

References 

American rock drummers
American heavy metal singers
American heavy metal drummers
Racer X (band) members
Michael Schenker Group members
Badlands (American band) members
UFO (band) members
Living people
1957 births
20th-century American drummers
American male drummers
20th-century American male musicians